B. Z. Glass was a member of the Wisconsin State Assembly.

Biography
Glass was born on April 30, 1897 in Litine, Russian Empire. He came to the US with his parents in 1903. He graduated from South Division High School in Milwaukee, Wisconsin in 1916 and from Marquette University in 1921. He married Charlotte Goldman in 1925.

Career
Glass was elected to the Assembly in 1924. He was a Republican.

References

Emigrants from the Russian Empire to the United States
Politicians from Milwaukee
Republican Party members of the Wisconsin State Assembly
Marquette University alumni
1897 births
Year of death missing
South Division High School alumni